Panomkorn Saisorn (Thai พนมกรณ์ สายสอน) is a Thai retired association football and futsal midfielder, and is a member of  Thailand national futsal team.

References

Panomkorn Saisorn
1981 births
Living people
Panomkorn Saisorn
Panomkorn Saisorn
Panomkorn Saisorn
Association football midfielders
Panomkorn Saisorn
Panomkorn Saisorn
Southeast Asian Games medalists in futsal
Panomkorn Saisorn
Panomkorn Saisorn
Competitors at the 2011 Southeast Asian Games